is the name given to railway rolling stock or train sets operated by the JR Group in Japan primarily for charters, special events, tourist excursions, and other similar purposes.

History
The "Joyful Train" concept can be traced back to 1960, when a 1935-vintage SuHaShi 29 dining car was converted into a Japanese-style o-zashiki train with tatami flooring and shoji paper screens on the windows. This could be coupled to regular service trains for use by charter parties. A second car was similarly modified in April 1961.

Lines in operation

JR Hokkaido

DMU

JR East

EMU

DMU

Loco hauled

JR West

EMU

DMU

Loco hauled

JR Shikoku

DMU

JR Kyushu

EMU

DMU

Loco hauled

Past Joyful Train sets

JNR

Loco hauled

JR Hokkaido

DMU

JR East

EMU

DMU

Loco hauled

JR Central

EMU

DMU

Loco hauled

JR West

EMU

DMU

Loco hauled

JR Shikoku

Loco hauled

JR Kyushu

DMU

Loco hauled

See also
 Excursion train

References

Further reading

External links
 JR East Joyful Trains 

Railway services introduced in 1960
1960 establishments in Japan
Diesel multiple units of Japan
Electric multiple units of Japan
Railway coaches of Japan